|}

The Sirenia Stakes is a Group 3 flat horse race in Great Britain open to two-year-old horses. It is run at Kempton Park over a distance of 6 furlongs (1,207 metres, and it is scheduled to take place each year in early September.

History
The event is named after Sirenia, a successful filly foaled in 1895. Her victories included Kempton's Duke of York Stakes and Great Jubilee Handicap, and she was subsequently a leading broodmare.

The Sirenia Stakes was originally contested on turf, and for a period it was classed at Listed level. It was promoted to Group 3 status in 2003, and was switched to a newly opened all-weather track in 2006.

Records
Leading jockey since 1974 (5 wins):
 Pat Eddery – Grundy (1974), Adviser (1976), Northern Chimes (1984), Silver Wizard (1992), Art of War (1994)

Leading trainer since 1974 (4 wins):
 Richard Hannon Sr. – Bletchley Park (1991), Arethusa (1996), Elnawin (2008), Brown Sugar (2013)

Winners since 1974

 The 2005 running took place at Newmarket.

See also
 Horse racing in Great Britain
 List of British flat horse races

References

 Paris-Turf: 
 Racing Post:
 galopp-sieger.de – Sirenia Stakes.
 horseracingintfed.com – International Federation of Horseracing Authorities – Sirenia Stakes (2018).
 pedigreequery.com – Sirenia Stakes – Kempton.

Flat races in Great Britain
Kempton Park Racecourse
Flat horse races for two-year-olds